The Brian Friel Theatre is a studio theatre located at Queen's University Belfast, Northern Ireland. It was opened in February 2009 and is named after the Irish dramatist, theatre director and author, Brian Friel.

The Theatre is part of the University's School of Languages, Literature and Performing Arts and the Brian Friel Centre for Theatre Research. It provides space for student drama teaching, rehearsals and performances and hosts both student and professional performances and events such as the Belfast Festival at Queen's.

The Brian Friel Theatre is located on University Square and shares its building with the Queen's Film Theatre.

See also
 Lyric Theatre (Belfast)

References

Culture in Belfast
Queen's University Belfast
Studio theatres in Northern Ireland
University and college theatres in Northern Ireland